Kenneth Leung Yuk-wai,  (born 3 March 1984 ), born and raised in Hong Kong, ancestry originate from Dongguan, GuangDong. He is currently the chairman of Hong Kong United Youth Association, the standing committee member of the 13th All-China Youth Federation, and a member of the legislative council.

life and education 

Born and raised in Kowloon City of Hong Kong, Kenneth Leung Yuk-wai have obtained a Bachelor of Business Administration and a Master of International Management from King's College between 2005 and 2006. He returned to Hong Kong in 2010 and actively present in the scenes of public services. He is especially interested in the communication channels between youths of mainland China and Hong Kong, and strives to create platforms and opportunities for encouraging further developments of communications. He is currently in charge of different government roles from both mainland China and Hong Kong, as well as titles from private sectors. He is also a businessman and politician who has been one of the members of the Legislative Council for the Election Committee constituency which was newly created under the electoral overhaul imposed by Beijing. He was awarded with the Chief Executive's Commendation for Community Service and Justice of the Peace from Government of Hong Kong respectively in 2016 and 2020, as well as receiving the Excellent committee award from Guangdong Youth Federation for 2 years in 2018 and 2019 consecutively.

On 5 January 2022, Carrie Lam announced new warnings and restrictions against social gathering due to potential COVID-19 outbreaks. One day later, it was discovered that Leung attended a birthday party hosted by Witman Hung Wai-man, with 222 guests. At least one guest tested positive with COVID-19, causing many guests to be quarantined.

Public Services 
National duties

 Standing Committee Member of the 13th All-China Youth Federation (All-China Youth Federation)

Youth Affairs

 Member of Government of Hong Kong's Youth Development Commission
 Chairman of Hong Kong United Youth Association
 Chief Consultant of Hong Kong Youths Unified Association

Electoral history

References 

Living people
HK LegCo Members 2022–2025
Hong Kong pro-Beijing politicians
1984 births